In taxonomy, Natronococcus is a genus of the Natrialbaceae.

Description and significance 
This haloalkaliphilic archaeon is in the same family as microorganisms like Halobacterium. Study of Natronococcus continues to explore what enzymes are present in order to survive in these conditions, especially since there has not been much literature about enzymes of haloalkaliphiles.

Genome structure 
The G + C content for the major chromosome is 64.0% while the minor component has a 55.7% content. The approximate size of the plasmid is 144 kbp.

Cell structure and metabolism 
Natronococcus is a heterotrophic, aerobic organism that can use sugars as an energy source to stimulate growth. It can fix nitrogen from casamino acids and reduces nitrates to nitrites. 

Cells are non-motile and occur in irregular clusters, pairs, and single cells. The cell is coccoid in shape and 1–2 micrometres in diameter. colonies are pale brown and circular.

Ecology 
N. occultus has been isolated from the soda lake Lake Magadi. This halophilic archaeon is partial to environments with 8–30% NaCl with optimum growth at 22%. It also grows in a pH range of 8.5–11 (optimum at 9.5) and a temperature range of 20–50 °C (optimum at 40 °C).

References

Further reading

Scientific journals

Scientific books

Scientific databases

External links

Type strain of Natronococcus occultus at BacDive -  the Bacterial Diversity Metadatabase

Archaea genera
Taxa described in 1984